The Cheatham Building is a historic building in Nashville, Tennessee.

Location
It is located at 301-309 Church Street in Nashville, Tennessee.

History
It was designed by architect Paul Isaacs. It was originally used for commercial purposes.

It was listed on the National Register of Historic Places on February 21, 1980.

References

Commercial buildings on the National Register of Historic Places in Tennessee
Buildings and structures in Nashville, Tennessee
National Register of Historic Places in Nashville, Tennessee
Commercial buildings completed in 1852
1852 establishments in Tennessee